The Platte is a summit,  high in the Fichtelgebirge in central Germany.
It is located between two other elevations, the Seehügel and the Hohe Matze, halfway between the Ochsenkopf and Kösseine mountains, on the Rhine-Elbe watershed.

External links 
www.bayern-fichtelgebirge.de/heimatkunde 
www.bayern-fichtelgebirge.de/schneeberg 

Mountains of the Fichtelgebirge
Mountains of Bavaria
Mountains under 1000 metres